Confederation Boulevard is a "ceremonial and discovery route" in Canada's National Capital Region, running through Parliament Hill and encompassing downtown areas in Ottawa and Gatineau. Some of Canada's most important institutions and landmarks lie along its route. During state visits, Confederation Boulevard is toured by foreign dignitaries. On Canada Day, much of Confederation Boulevard is closed to cars. Confederation Boulevard is an initiative of the National Capital Commission (NCC).

The route's name commemorates Canadian Confederation.

Design

Confederation Boulevard is a collection of several streets in Ottawa and Gatineau, forming a loop with several spurs. In order to connect these streets visually, urban designers employed the use of consistent street paving (using pink Canadian granite), lampposts adorned with bronze maple leaves, and distinctive street furniture. Along the route, art exhibits and interpretation panels can also be found. Opposite sides of the Boulevard were designed somewhat differently to emphasize the relationship between the "Town" (normal urban space) and the "Crown" (federal government space).

The NCC created annual Confederation Boulevard banners display in 1992 for Canada's 125th birthday celebrations and the development of Confederation Boulevard. Since then, the NCC has commemorated important anniversaries and milestones in Canada's history with banners on the boulevard, including the 400th anniversary of Acadia (2004), the Year of the Veteran and the centenaries of Alberta and Saskatchewan (2005), the 150th anniversary of the Canadian Museum of Civilization (2006), and the 100th Anniversary of Parks Canada (2011).

Attractions
24 Sussex Drive (the official residence of the Prime Minister of Canada)
Byward Market
Canadian Museum of History
Confederation Park
National War Memorial (Canada)
Garden of the Provinces
National Gallery of Canada
National Arts Centre
Parliament Hill
Rideau Hall (the official residence of the Governor General of Canada)
Royal Canadian Mint
Supreme Court of Canada

Awards
Honours for Confederation Boulevard include an award from the American Society of Landscape Architects and the Award of Honour from the Canadian Society of Landscape Architects.

References

External links
Confederation Boulevard, National Capital Commission
The NCC Readies Confederation Boulevard for the Summer Season, OttawaStart

Roads in Ottawa
Streets in Gatineau
Boulevards
National Capital Region (Canada)
National Capital Commission
State ritual and ceremonies